Octavian Gabriel Vâlceanu (born 13 October 1996) is a Romanian professional footballer who plays as a goalkeeper for Liga I club Petrolul Ploiești, on loan from Liga I club Voluntari.

References

External links
 
 Octavian Vâlceanu at lpf.ro

1996 births
Living people
Footballers from Bucharest
Romanian footballers
Association football goalkeepers
Liga I players
Liga II players
Liga III players
FC Sportul Studențesc București players
LPS HD Clinceni players
CS Gaz Metan Mediaș players
FC Voluntari players
FC Petrolul Ploiești players